Martin Dočekal (born December 7, 1990) is a Czech professional ice hockey player. He currently plays with HC Kometa Brno in the Czech Extraliga.

Dočekal made his Czech Extraliga debut playing with HC Kometa Brno debut during the 2012–13 Czech Extraliga season.

References

External links

1990 births
Living people
Czech ice hockey forwards
HC Kometa Brno players
Sportspeople from Třebíč
HC Plzeň players
SK Horácká Slavia Třebíč players
HC Vítkovice players